Henry Kennedy may refer to:

 Henry H. Kennedy Jr. (born 1948), American judge
 Henry Kennedy (architect) (died 1898), British architect
 Henry Kennedy (cricketer) (born 1882), Jamaican cricketer

See also
 Harry Kennedy (disambiguation)